Wan Intan Edrinas binti Wan Mokhtar (born 8 March 1983), better known as Dynas Mokhtar, is a Malaysian model, actress, television host, and fashion designer based in Kuala Lumpur.

Early life
Dynas is the middle child in a family of three children. Her father is an engineer and her mother is a businesswoman. She is an Assunta Alumna, having attended both Assunta Primary School and Assunta Secondary School in Petaling Jaya.

Career
In 2004, at age 21, Dynas made the FHM's 100 Sexiest Women list, boosting her career and making her an A-list actress and supermodel in Malaysia and Indonesia.

Modelling
Her modelling career took off when, at age seventeen, she was offered modelling positions in television and print commercials. She began her career as a catwalk model with various modelling agencies and was also featured in advertisements for KFC, Celcom, Dunhill, Pepsi, Knorr, Nestlé and HSBC Malaysia.

TV hosting
She ventured into TV hosting on Astro's Beat TV with Bront Palarae. She also hosted TV3's Si Kecil Ku Chak! in 2010, a programme for young mothers and mothers-to-be.

Acting
Dynas  starred in the television series Dibawah Ketiak Isteri alongside Kencana Dewi, Leez AF5, Radhi Khalid, Bob Ahmal, Zizan, Harun Salim Bachik, et al. The series' second season ran on Astro Prima. She also starred in season three of Astro Ria's Awan Dania, and played a wicked hag in the smash hit, supernatural-themed series, Susuk for two seasons. In 2007, she landed a role in Gerak Khas, a long-running police drama series which has been broadcast on TV1 since 1999.

After gaining television exposure, Dynas began acting in films, starring in Haru Biru, Cinta Kolesterol, I Know What You Did Last Raya, Impak Maksima, and dramas such as Janji Diana and Cinta Kau & Aku.

Brand ambassador
Dynas has also been a brand ambassador and spokesperson for various health and beauty products such as Safi Balqis, a halal skin care product (2008), Kunzense, a slimming, beauty and wellness company (2011),Qutie Coat, a whitening cream mask that improves complexion (2012) and Pet Pet, a global baby products brand (2013).

Fashion design
In 2009, in partnership with Awal Ashaari, they opened a fashion boutique known as DnA CelebrityStyle in Desa Sri Hartamas. This business was subsequently closed and the partners ventured out on their own. Dynas launched DNA By Dynas in 2011, a new collection consisting of maternity and breastfeeding wear. She designs most of her collections alongside a team of seamstresses and wholesale manufacturers. She officially launched her first boutique, Dynas Nursing Attire at The Curve, Mutiara Damansara in 2012.

Personal life
Dynas married Mohd Hafizy Hafiz on 15 March 2008. The couple has two children, a daughter Khyra Khalyssa (born 24 April 2010) and a son Mohamed Haqaish (born 15 June 2012). Her first pregnancy, in 2009, ended in premature stillbirth due to pulmonary hypoplasia. The couple divorced in early 2014, after a string of denials.

Controversies
In October 2005, while shooting for a local drama Siti Aishah, Dynas and several crew members were arrested on suspicion of drug possession during a raid at a house in Kota Bharu, Kelantan. She was released on bail and subsequently tried at the Kota Bharu Magistrates Court. The charge against her was later dropped after one of the crew members plead guilty to the drug possession charge.

Filmography

Film

Television series

Telemovie

Television

Awards and nominations
Anugerah Skrin
 Pelakon Baru Anugerah Skrin Pantene (2007) (nominated)
 Pelakon Pembantu Filem Terbaik (2008) (nominated)

Festival Filem Malaysia
 Pelakon Pembantu Filem Terbaik (2008) (nominated)

Anugerah Bintang Popular Berita Harian
 Pelakon TV Wanita Paling Popular (2007, 2008, 2009)

EH! Magazine
 Anugerah Susuk Tubuh Terbaik (2008)

SHOUT! Awards
 Most Stylish Award (2009)

References

External links
 

1983 births
People from Selangor
Malaysian people of Malay descent
Malaysian female models
Malaysian actresses
Malaysian television personalities
Living people